Rolf Graf (28 April 1960 in Oslo, Norway – 1 July 2013 in Oslo) was a Norwegian singer, bass guitarist, composer and record producer, and the younger brother of keyboardist Haakon Graf (b. 21 March 1955) and the jazz singer Randi Elisabeth Graf (b. 12 September 1966). He is best known as the bassist in the band Lava, but was also recognized as music producer, musician and songwriter for other artists like Randy Crawford, Mezzoforte and Sissel Kyrkjebø. He also released three solo albums and was editor of the journal "Musikkpraksis".

Career

Musician 
Graf was raised in a musical family and was greatly inspired by his older brother Haakon known from bands like 'Ruphus', 'Hawk on Flight', and collaborations with such as Terje Rypdal and Jan Garbarek. Graf started his career in 1967 on trumpet, and debuted as a soloist 1 Christmas Day 1972 in Manglerud church.

In 1974 he substituted the trumpet to bass guitar and started the following year a rock band together with the guitarist Marius Müller. In 1979 he got his first professional studio job as a funk bass player. Graf was among the first funk bassists in Norway that restrained slap and snap technique, and the artist and vocalist Alex, or Alex Naumik Sandøy, who was among the first artists to introduced the funk rock in Norway, hired him to play on her album Daddy Child, because her bass player and producer Svein Gundersen failed to play this new style.

The same year he also received a request from Svein Dag Hauge to join the band Lava, where Marius Müller just had joined and recommended Graf, after meeting with Hauge. Lava's second album Cruisin''', sold to Silver and climbed the charts. Grafs first composition, "Take Your Time" (with lyrics by Ivar Dyrhaug), climbed to the top of the European summit. Seven CD album was recorded at Lava and a variety of studio work, as well as a composer and producer on numerous recordings.

In 1985 Graf recorded his debut solo album The Boy Next Door, which was released in 13 European countries. This led to appearances in British and Danish TV shows. From the mid 1980s onwards 1990s Graf worked in various compositions, including with Olav Stedje og Egil Eldøen in the band project 'Stedje/Graf/Eldøen', and this was the first band to play at the opening of Rockefeller Music Hall in 1986. Otherwise contributed Graf as a studio musician with artists like Sissel Kyrkjebø, Randy Crawford and Elisabeth Andreassen.

For a period in the 1990s, Graf worked in Los Angeles and New York as a songwriter and producer, and had the production of an American band called 'The Ancestors' where he replaced the producer Eddie Kramer, and collaborated with musician and actor Rick Springfield as songwriter. Graf has also produced the debut album Stille vann by Norwegian artist Torhild Nigar in the New York studio Manhattan Center Studios.

Lava made their comeback album Polarity in 2003. This led to a lot of activity on the Norwegian music scene, and appearances on NRK television along with Hanne Boel, among others. In 2005 the band released the sequel Alibi, and in 2009 Lava released their last album, Symphonic Journey, in collaboration with Kringkastingsorkesteret.

  Composer 
Graf was invited to participate as a composer in Melodi Grand Prix 1983, and delivered the song "Melodi" performed by Olav Stedje as number four. In Melodi Grand Prix 1985 he performed his self-composed song, "II & II". Since this he participated several times in the 1980s and 1990s, but then only as a songwriter. In 1984 he launched a side project called 'Mr. Walker & The Walkmen' together with Steinar Fjeld and Ståle Rasmussen, and got a hit with "This Is Your Walkman Talking". During 1985, 30 of his compositions released on record with different musicians, including himself. Best known from this time were the ballad "Shine", performed together with Egil Eldøen and the Swedish singer Frank Ådahl. The song was the highlight of Grafs debut solo album, The Boy Next Door. The album was released in 13 countries, and Graf appeared on television in England and Denmark.

 Producer 
As a producer worked Graf with several other musicians, including Randy Crawford (USA), Mezzoforte (Iceland), The Ancestors (USA), Tindrum, Aina Olsen, Trine Rein, Jan Werner Danielsen, Torhild Nigar and 'Floweryard'. He also created music for the movies Frida – med hjertet i hånden, Petra og kuule småkryp by Torhild Nigar and Brødrene Dal Og Vikingsverdets Forbannelse. In 1996 he produced the album I evighet by Elisabeth Andreassen, who received second place in the international Melodi Grand Prix final in Oslo Spektrum.

Late 1980s Graf started a trio with Egil Eldøen and Olav Stedje. Musically, this was a continuation of the acoustic, country rock, inspired by Eagles and Crosby, Stills & Nash. The trio was disbanded before they managed to make a record together. In the early 1990s he was oriented towards Latin music within the trio 'Some Like It Hot' including Lakki Patey (band leader) and Sergio Gonzales (reunited in 2004).

In 2001 Graf finally found time to record a new solo album Oddity Two Acceptance, where he played almost all the instruments by himself. The album also includes a retake of "Shine".

Graf also taught in 'Knowledge of the music industry' at 'Nordisk Institutt for Scene og Studio', and wrote a recipe for the project Opp og Fram on behalf of Høgskolen i Harstad.

In recent years (2011) Graf worked with other musicians and artists like Ronni Le Tekrø and Jan Ingvar Toft.

Graf was buried in Holmenkollen Chapel 11 July 2013.

 Discography 

 Solo albums 
1985: The Boy Next Door (Mariann)
1997: Floating (MultiMusic)
2001: Oddity To Acceptance (MultiMusic)

 Collaborations 
Tom Bråthen & Phoenix
1979: Jeg Drømmer Om NashvilleLava
1980: Lava (Polydor Records)
1981: Cruisin' (Polydor Records)
1982: Prime Time (Polydor Records)
1984: Fire (Polydor Records)
1985: Prime Cuts (Polydor Records)
1990: Rhythm of Love (Polydor Records)
1996: The Very Best of Lava (Polydor Records)
2003: Polarity (Polydor Records)
2005: Alibi (album)|Alibi (Polydor Records)
2009: Symphonic Journey (Polydor Records)

Svein Strøm
1980: My Life Is My LifeGry Jannicke Jarlum
1981: Min Stil1983: Draculas Datter1989: Svake mennesker2005: Aksepterad – De 18 Beste NorskeEigil Berg
1981: Alhambra1986: Here We Go AgainTrond-Viggo Torgersen
1981: Det by'ner nå!1997: Trond-Viggos besteMarius Müller
1981: Den Du Veit1982: Er'e Så Nøye 'A1983: MariusPrima Vera
1981: Den 5teDollie de Luxe
1981: Dollies dagbok1982: First ActTrond Granlund
1981: Pleasant SurpriseOlav Stedje
1982: Olav Stedje1982: Tredje Stedje1995: Bot og bedring1998: 21 Beste2009: I Levande LiveHilde Heltberg
1982: Hilde Heltberg1991: Girls Don'tThorleif Larsen alias Igor Kill
1983: Igor KillVazelina Bilopphøggers
1983: Vælkømmin Tel ØssBjarte Leithaug
1984: En underlig familieArnold Børud
1984: Balladen Om Jesus – Rock-OperaForente artister
1985: Sammen For LivetAlf Cranner
1985: Din tanke er friBobbysocks
1985: Bobbysocks1986: Waiting for the MorningRandi Hansen
1985: Ansiktet i speiletMr. Walker and the Walkmen
1985: WalkingRandy Crawford
1986: Abstract Emotions1992: Through the Eyes of Love1999: HitsAina S. Olsen
1988: Living in a Boy's WorldSmall Affairs
1988: Out of MemoryRita Eriksen
1988: Back from Wonderland (1988)

Mezzoforte
1989: Playing for Time2003: The Very Best of Mezzoforte2007: Anniversary Edition2008: Live in ReykjavikTvers
1989: Tvers synger CrouchViggo & Reidar
1989: Tidligere utgitt på alvorRomance
1989: AngelOla Fjellvikås
1989: Min Mona LisaCaptain Miracle
1990: Voyage To Sensational Alex Harvey BandTinDrum
1991: Cool, Calm and CollectedOks Singers & Band
1992: Live! Camp MeetingHanne Krogh
1994: 40 BesteTorhild Nigar
1994: Stille VannJan Werner Danielsen
1994: All By MyselfElisabeth Andreassen
1996: I evighet1996: EternityBare Egil Band
1996: Absolutt Ikke Bare Egil BandMerethe Trøan
1996: Æ Gir Dæ Min Vår1996: Søtt & Salt (1996)
1996: Kom Te Mæ (1996)
1997: Ild & vann (1997)

Jannicke Abrahamsen
199: Jannicke 7KLM
1997: Viking Arne1997: Brødrene Dal på vikingtokt2002: De BesteTriple & Touch
1998: De 3 Vise Männen2008: 1000 GångerOslo Gospel Choir
1999: Millenium1999: PowerØyvind Blunck
1999: Fridtjofs HelaftenKikki, Bettan & Lotta
2002: Vem é dé du vill haFloweryard
2003: The Rain2003: Path of Tears2003:Morning MistClausen + Wille
2003: FriTommy Michaelsen
2005: CompletelyTrygve Wikstøl
2006: HeiDet Betales
2007: Har du det bra?2007: Guri & en ChevyHovedøen Social Club
2009: Ay caramba!Otto Graf
2009: AutographsCecilie Nesstrand
2011: Tør du tenke, with Jan Toft
2011: Ett LivOther projects
1983: DEFA-kampanjen 83–841989: Musikalen Jungelboken1992: Norwegian Power Ballads1994: Up And Coming: The Sound Of Young Norway1994: Fine Norske Vinterlåter1994: Gloryland WorldCup USA 941995: Solskiva – Årets Nye Sommersanger1996: Topp Hits 21996: Smurfehits 11996: Norsk Gull! Topplag Med 20 Norske Artister2003: Våre Beste Vinterlåter2004: En Annen Dans2006: Barna Synger Pophits''

References

External links

Rolf Graf: – Når historien må kjempe mot kunnskapsløshet at Ballade.no (in Norwegian)

1960 births
2013 deaths
Musicians from Oslo
20th-century Norwegian bass guitarists
Norwegian male bass guitarists
21st-century Norwegian bass guitarists
Norwegian jazz bass guitarists
Norwegian jazz composers
Jazz-pop musicians
Melodi Grand Prix contestants
20th-century bass guitarists
21st-century Norwegian guitarists
Male jazz composers
20th-century Norwegian male musicians
21st-century Norwegian male musicians
Lava (band) members